John Boor  (d. ca. 1402) was a Canon of Windsor from 1389 - 1402 and Dean of the Chapel Royal.

Career

He was appointed:
Rector of St Creed, Grantpound 1384
Dean of the Chapel Royal
Rector of St John the Baptist's Church, Westbourne 1397 - 1399
Prebendary of Gates in Chichester 1390 - 1397
Prebendary of Middleton in Wherwell
Prebendary of Charminster
Prebendary of Oundle
Prebendary of Shaftesbury
Prebendary of Bridgnorth
Dean of St Buryan's Church, Cornwall.

He was appointed to the twelfth stall in St George's Chapel, Windsor Castle in 1398, and held the stall until 1402.

Notes 

1400s deaths
Canons of Windsor
Deans of the Chapel Royal
Year of birth missing